Antmusic: The Very Best of Adam Ant is a greatest hits compilation album from Adam Ant that covers his early work with Adam and the Ants as well as his solo work.

This greatest hits package reached number six on the UK album chart The corresponding VHS, with all the music videos to the classic Ant/Ants hits, also charted very well on the UK video charts.

Disc one
The first CD covers all of the UK Singles Chart hits from Adam Ant's career (with and without the Ants) from 1980–1990, beginning with Young Parisians & the earliest Dirk Wears White Sox singles from Do It Records (which were re-released once the Ants found fame and charted in the UK Top 40), and ending with the charting singles from his then most recent album, Manners & Physique - "Room at the Top" and "Can't Set Rules About Love".

The initial edition which hit number six on the UK Album charts was a single-disc release featuring only this disc.

Disc two
The second CD is a live recording of a private concert held on 21 February 1993 at a rehearsal studio in Burbank, Los Angeles.  This show was a warm-up for a tour to attract A&R interest from potential new labels for the (then still forthcoming) release of his planned album, Persuasion after MCA Records had dropped Ant the previous year. (In the end, Ant signed with Capitol Records but Persuasion was eventually shelved when MCA refused to hand over the masters, so Wonderful was recorded and released instead.)

This second disc was added as part of a second edition of the album in early 1994.

Although Ant has released concert videos/DVDs, live bonus CD single tracks (on the 1995 single Gotta Be A Sin) and a live CD of a 2007 reading of his biography including acoustic versions of some of his songs, this CD remains one of only two full length audio-only live albums of a concert with a full band that Ant has ever issued, along with the 2016 release of a 1981 concert along with the remastered Kings of the Wild Frontier album.

Track listing

References

Adam Ant albums
1993 greatest hits albums